Ciucur-Mingir is a village in Cimișlia District, Moldova.

Notable people
 Nicolae Cernov
 Ilarion Ciobanu

References

Villages of Cimișlia District